The Unruly Imagination is the twenty-fifth solo album by Julian Cope, released in 2009.

It was recorded with musicians from Cope's side project Black Sheep and released in a limited edition. Released to coincide with a one-day event of the same name, organized by Cope, dedicated to democracy, protest and free speech at Manchester University's  Whitworth Gallery. The album is a collection of new songs especially recorded for this project plus two songs from an unreleased EP Diggers, Ranters, Levellers. "Preaching Revolution", "Mother, Where Is My Father?", "I Wanna Know What's in it For Me" and "Fuck Me U.S.A." were previously released as the vinyl only 7” EP Preaching Revolution by Julian Cope & Black Sheep in 2008.

"Mother, Where Is My Father?" was originally recorded by David Peel & The Lower East Side on their 1968 album Have a Marijuana.

Track listing

Personnel
Musicians
Julian Cope 
Christopher Patrick "Holy" McGrail 
Ady "Acoustika" Fletcher
Michael O'Sullivan
Big Nige
Chris "Christophe F." Farrell
Adam "Randy Apostle" Whittaker
Paul "Fat Paul" Horlick
Ian "Mister E." Bissett
David Wrench

Technical
Produced by Julian Cope
Recorded by Adam Whittaker, David Wrench, Stuart "7stu7" Matthews
Design by Holy McGrail

References

2009 albums
Julian Cope albums